Robert or Bob Carter may refer to:

Entertainers 
Bob Carter (musician) (1922–1993), American jazz bassist and arranger born Robert Kahakalau
Robert "Bob" Carter (1929–2013), aka Sammy Terry, Indianapolis horror host television personality
Robert Carter (ballet dancer), African-American ballet dancer

Politicians 
Robert Carter I (1663–1732), American businessman and colonist in Virginia
Robert Carter III (1727/8–1804), United States founding father
Robert Carter (magistrate) (1791–1872), naval officer and magistrate in colonial Newfoundland
Robert Meek Carter (1814–1882), English politician, Member of Parliament for Leeds
Bobby Carter (1939–2015), American politician

Soldiers 
Robert Carter (RAF officer) (1910–2012), British military pilot
Robert Randolph Carter (1825–1888), American naval officer
Robert G. Carter (1845–1936), U.S. cavalry officer and Medal of Honor recipient

Sportsmen 
Robert Carter (basketball) (born 1994), American basketball player
Bob Carter (cricketer, born 1937), English cricketer for Worcestershire
Robert Carter (cricketer, born 1960), English cricketer for Northamptonshire, and for Canterbury in New Zealand
Robert Carter (footballer) (1880–1928), English pre-war football player

Others 
Robert Carter (editor) (1819–1879), United States editor
Robert Brudenell Carter (1828–1918), British physician and ophthalmic surgeon
Robert L. Carter (1917–2012), civil rights activist, NAACP lawyer, and U.S. District Court judge
Robert L. Carter (Illinois judge), former justice of the Illinois Supreme Court
Robert M. Carter (1942–2016), Australian geologist and palaeontologist
Robert Carter (priest) (1927–2010), Roman Catholic priest and gay rights activist
Rob Carter (born 1949), American professor of typography and graphic design
Robert B. Carter (born 1960), American business executive with FedEx

See also
 Robert Carver (disambiguation)